Cameron Collins (born September 29, 1989) is a former professional American football linebacker who played in one game for the Houston Texans during the 2012-13 NFL playoffs.

Playing career 
Collins played football in high school at Santa Monica High School and in college at Oregon State.

In the 2012–13 NFL playoffs, he played for the Houston Texans during their 19-13 victory over the Cincinnati Bengals in the wild card opening round. Collins was on the field for 17 special teams plays in the game.

He never appeared in an NFL regular season game.

See also
2012 Houston Texans season

References 

1989 births
Living people
American football linebackers
Oregon State Beavers football players
Houston Texans players
People from Cherry Point, North Carolina
Players of American football from North Carolina